Lyndon Amick (born June 30, 1977) is a former NASCAR driver. He spent most of his NASCAR career in the NASCAR Busch Series driving for his family-owned team.

Racing career
Amick was the 1996 NASCAR Goody's Dash series champion. Amick made his NASCAR Busch Series debut in 1997, driving the No. 35 Pontiac Grand Prix owned by his father, Bill. Despite sharing the same last name, his father wasn't the Bill Amick who have raced in the NASCAR Winston West Series. He had sponsorship from Rockwell Automation and ran fifteen races. Amick made his first career start in the 1997 race at Daytona International Speedway. He started in the 37th position in the 45-car field, but finished 44th after a multi-car crash on lap 28 forced him out of the race early. Out of the rest of the races he ran that season, he only managed a best finish of 15th at IRP and only had two other top-20 finishes. His best start was a 12th at the fall race at Darlington. After his rookie run, Amick made a dozen starts in 1998. In back to back starts, Amick earned a 4th at Myrtle Beach and an 8th at South Boston. In his return to IRP, Amick also earned a 3rd place starting position. He ended the season in 45th place in points.

In nineteen starts in 1999, Amick received sponsorship from SCANA Pontiac, Amick recorded three top-10s including a fifth. Also, Amick matched his best career start of 3rd at Las Vegas.  Amick made his first full-time run in 2000. Amick had three top-10s, with a best finish of 9th at Richmond, and finished 28th in points. That same year, Amick made his Craftsman Truck Series debut with Ken Schrader Racing in the inaugural race at Daytona. He started 3rd and ran well. He was seventh on lap 56, but finished 22nd after a fiery crash with Geoffrey Bodine. Amick returned at IRP, starting 13th, and leading 7 laps before finishing 2nd, barely losing to Joe Ruttman.

After losing sponsor SCANA, Amick ran six races in 2001. He earned a 7th at Watkins Glen International Raceway, but suffered two crashes and one engine failure. He also drove in two more Truck races for Schrader, finishing 9th at Daytona.

In 2002, Amick began the season in the No. 26 Dr Pepper Chevy full-time for Carroll Racing. He managed a best finish of 14th at Rockingham, and after ten races and a 31st at Richmond, Amick was released in favor of Ron Hornaday Jr. Amick's best weekend was a one-race deal with ppc Racing at Kansas. He started 12th and ran well to a 9th-place finish. Amick's final start came at Talladega in 2003, when he leased a car from Braun Racing and finished 36th after an early crash.

Military career
In May 2003, Amick enlisted in the South Carolina Army National Guard, in which he was a sergeant with the Bravo Company of the 1st Battalion, 118th Infantry Regiment. In 2007, he was deployed in combat during Operation Enduring Freedom in Afghanistan.

Motorsports career results

NASCAR
(key) (Bold – Pole position awarded by qualifying time. Italics – Pole position earned by points standings or practice time. * – Most laps led.)

Busch Series

Craftsman Truck Series

ARCA Re/Max Series
(key) (Bold – Pole position awarded by qualifying time. Italics – Pole position earned by points standings or practice time. * – Most laps led.)

References

Sources
[ Former NASCAR driver heads to Afghanistan]
Back from the trenches.

External links
 

Living people
1977 births
People from Saluda, South Carolina
Racing drivers from South Carolina
NASCAR drivers
ISCARS Dash Touring Series drivers
South Carolina National Guard personnel
United States Army personnel of the War in Afghanistan (2001–2021)
ARCA Menards Series drivers